Intoxicate O.S. is the second full-length album by the Finnish dark metal band Shade Empire. The album was recorded at Studio Perkele in Finland.

Intoxicate O.S. is the first Shade Empire album to include a video, "Chemical God." The video caused some controversy due to the fact it contained "flashing images", reason for which it was banned from MTV.

Regardless of this, the album turned out to be decently successful commercially, since it reached number 25 in weekly Finnish album sales, as stated at FinnishCharts.

Track listing
"Slitwrist Ecstasy" – 3:26.  Song had been released on a two-track single 14 days prior to the release of Intoxicate O.S.
"Bloodstar" – 4:58
"Chemical God" – 5:13
"Rat in a Maze" – 4:05
"Soulslayers" – 6:01
"Silver Fix" – 4:05
"Embrace the Gods of Suffering" – 4:17
"Ravine" – 2:50
"Hatefeast" – 5:05

Credits
Juha Harju – vocals
Janne Niiranen – guitars
Juha Sirkkiä – guitars
Olli Savolainen – synthesizer
Eero Mantere – bass guitar
Antti Makkonen – drums
Hylzy Hyvärinen – clean vocals
Mixed by S. Jämsén
Mastered by Minerva Pappi at Finnvox Studios

Video "Chemical God" directed by Ari Reinikainen
Lights engineered by Jussi Kotka

Artwork & layout Jarno Lahti
Band Photos by Maria K.

References

External links
Shade Empire Discography

Shade Empire albums
2006 albums